The Weil is  river in Hesse, Germany. It is a left tributary to the Lahn river and the town of Weilburg is located next to its mouth. The river flows exclusively through the Taunus mountain range with its source being located between the Kleiner Feldberg and Großer Feldberg mountains. It flows through Schmitten, Weilrod and Weilmünster. A hiking trail as well as a biking trail follow the course of the river.

References

Kümmerly+Frey: The New International Atlas. Rand McNally (1980)

External links 

List of German rivers (German)

Rivers of Hesse
Rivers of the Taunus
Rivers of Germany